Fort Apache Historic Park (Tł’óghagai in Apache) is a tribal historic park of the White Mountain Apache, located at the former site of Fort Apache on the Fort Apache Indian Reservation. The park interprets the rich and troubled history of relations between the Apache and other Native American tribes at the fort, which was converted into a Bureau of Indian Affairs boarding school after its military use ended.

Description and history

The park includes a landscape of 27 historic buildings, ruins and remnants of others, and the fort's former parade ground. The White Mountain Apache Cultural Center (Nohwike’ Bágowa, or House of Our Footprints, in Apache), is located at the western end of the park. The post was situated at the end of a military road built into Apachería. Its purpose was to control the Coyotero Apaches. At first it was a temporary camp called Camp Ord later changed to Camp Mogollon, Camp Thomas and Camp Apache. It became a permanent facility in 1873 and in 1879 the name was changed to Fort Apache.

The fort was established in 1870 as a temporary military camp, and was placed on a more permanent footing ten years later.  It played a crucial role in the Indian Wars of the late 19th century, serving first as a check on Apache control of the area, and later as a recruitment point for Apaches as scouts in conflicts with other tribes.  The fort was one of the places where African-American Buffalo Soldiers were stationed.  Only a few buildings survive from the early years of the fort's history, including a log cabin that served as an early commandant's quarters, a guardhouse, and an adjutant's office.  Barracks and other quarters built in the 1880s and 1890s also survive.

Its use as a military facility obsolete, the property was in 1923 turned over to the Bureau of Indian Affairs (BIA), which established the Theodore Roosevelt School on the property.  It was established as a boarding school providing educational services to several Native tribes in the region.  Although it was located on Apache tribal land, the school was mainly intended to educate Navajo youth, by removing them from their reservation and encouraging the adoption of non-Native customs.  This practice of the BIA was widely disliked by the tribes.

During the school's boarding period (a tribal school of the same name continues to operate in some of the buildings) a variety of further buildings were added to the site, including a cafeteria, additional dormitories, and maintenance buildings.  A significant number of these buildings still survive, and have been repurposed to other functions by the tribe.

Historic structures of Fort Apache

The following are images of some of the historical ruins and remaining structures in Fort Apache.
 The First Commanding Officer's Quarters a.k.a. "General Crook's Cabin" – built in 1871
 The Commanding Officer's Quarters – built in 1892
 The Captain's Quarters (102) – built in 1891
 The Captain's Quarters (103) – built in 1891
 The Officer's Quarters – built in 1883
 The Girl's Dormitory – Native-American girl's dormitory built in 1931 where the Fort's hospital once stood
 The Boy's Dormitory – Native-American boys dormitory built in 1932
 The Bureau of Indian Affairs Club House – built in 1930
 The Theodore Roosevelt School – built in 1923
 The Theodore Roosevelt School Cafeteria –  built in 1948
 The Barracks ruins – built in the 1880s
 Fort ruins – c. 1880s

See also
 List of National Historic Landmarks in Arizona
 National Register of Historic Places listings in Navajo County, Arizona

References

External links
 Fort Apache Historic Park web site

Parks in Navajo County, Arizona
Native American history of Arizona
National Historic Landmarks in Arizona
Buildings and structures in Navajo County, Arizona
Archaeological sites on the National Register of Historic Places in Arizona
Apache
Historic districts on the National Register of Historic Places in Arizona
National Register of Historic Places in Navajo County, Arizona
Ruins in the United States
Former school buildings in the United States
Closed military facilities of the United States in the United States
Museums in Navajo County, Arizona
Native American museums in Arizona
Parks on the National Register of Historic Places in Arizona
1976 establishments in Arizona
Protected areas established in 1976
White Mountain Apache Tribe